The West Texas A&M Buffaloes, also known as the WTAMU Buffaloes or WT Buffaloes, and formerly West Texas State Buffaloes and WTSU Buffaloes, are the athletic teams that represent West Texas A&M University, located in Canyon, Texas, in NCAA Division II intercollegiate sports. The Buffaloes, colloquially known as the Buffs (men) and Lady Buffs (women), compete as members of the Lone Star Conference for all 14 varsity sports.

West Texas A&M was a member of the Border Intercollegiate Athletic Association from 1941 to 1961. The football team won a conference championship in 1950. The Buffs were members of the Missouri Valley Conference from 1972 to 1985.

Varsity sports

Men's sports
 Baseball
 Basketball
 Cross Country
 Football
 Golf
 Soccer
 Track & Field

Women's sports
 Basketball
 Cross Country
 Golf
 Soccer
 Softball
 Track & Field
 Volleyball

National championships

Team

Individual teams

Football

The football team plays its home games at Bain-Schaffer Buffalo Stadium, a newly built, on-campus stadium. Previously, WT played at Kimbrough Memorial Stadium. The Buffs play rival Eastern New Mexico University each fall for the Wagon Wheel trophy, and rival Midwestern State University for the Highway 287 Challenge Cup.

Sun Bowl Champions
1949, 1962

Tangerine (Citrus Bowl) Champions
1957

Pasadena Bowl Champions
1967

Kanza Bowl Champions
2009, 2011

NCAA DII Playoffs
National Semifinals: 2012

Basketball
The Buff and Lady Buff basketball teams play in the First United Bank Center, a 5,800 seat multi-purpose arena in Canyon, Texas.  It was built in 2002.  It is the home of the Buffaloes basketball teams.  The traditional rival is Eastern New Mexico University, but newer rivalries with Midwestern State University and The University of Texas of the Permian Basin have emerged in recent years. A strong tradition of basketball exists at West Texas A&M, dating back to the days of Maurice Cheeks and even as far back as the 1930s and 1940s. The 1954-55 season saw the Buffs make the NCAA tournament, though they would lose to eventual national champion San Francisco University. In 2018-2019, WT became the first school in NCAA history to have both the men's and women's teams host a regional tournament.

From WTAMU Record Book

Men's Basketball Postseason

Women's Basketball Postseason

Volleyball
The Lady Buff volleyball team is a four-time NCAA Division II National Champion, winning the title in 1990, 1991, 1997, and most recently in 2022. The Lady Buffs holding one of the best home winning records in any level of competitive volleyball, which currently sits at 523-83 (495-49 at the D2 level). The team plays its home matches at Britkare Court at the WTAMU Fieldhouse aka “The Box.”

Cross Country 

The Buffaloes and the Lady Buffs are one of the few Division II institutions that has an on campus cross country course, known as "The Range."

The Buffaloes have won the Missouri Valley Conference Championship in 1977, and 1979, and the Lone Star Conference Championship in 2013, 2014, 2015, 2016, 2017, 2018, 2019, and 2020.  The men have had individual champions in the MVC in 1977 (Joseph Kemei), 1978 (Johnson Bett), 1979 (Johnson Bett), and 1985 (Carlos Ybarra) and in the LSC in 2013 (Dylan Doss), 2015 (Geoffrey Kipchumba), 2016 (Geoffrey Kipchumba), and 2017 (Owen Hind). The men have qualified for the national championships every year since 2013, and had a program best 11th place finish in 2014. The Buffaloes have had 3 NCAA DII All-Americans, Geoffrey Kipchumba(2015,2016), Owen Hind (2017), and Briggs Wittlake (2018).
Ezekiel Kipchichir won the 2019 South Central Region meet.

The Lady Buffs have won the Lone Star Conference Championship in 2012 and 2013.  The women have had individual champions in 2012 and 2014.

Indoor/ Outdoor Track
West Texas A&M Women's Outdoor Track & Field won the 2017 and 2022 National Championships defeating Grand Valley State each time in three day events. The Women's Indoor Track & Field team won the 2018 National Championship.

Baseball

Softball 
The West Texas A&M Lady Buffs softball team Won the National Championship in 2014 defeating Valdosta State. in 2021, the Lady Buffs won their second title, defeating Biola University 2 games to 1.

Notable alumni
 Joe Fortenberry — winner of the first tournament of Basketball at the 1936 Summer Olympics
 Maurice Cheeks - Hall of Fame NBA basketball player and coach
 Mercury Morris - former NFL running back for the Miami Dolphins
 David Tameilau — plays rugby for the United States national rugby union team
 Duane Thomas - former NFL running back for the Dallas Cowboys

In addition to the above, the football program produced several alumni who went on to notable careers in professional wrestling:
 Tully Blanchard – member of the WWE Hall of Fame as part of the Four Horsemen stable
 Bobby Duncum Sr.
 Manny Fernandez
 Dory Funk Jr. – member of the WWE Hall of Fame
 Terry Funk – brother of Dory Jr. and also a member of the WWE Hall of Fame; also a pioneer of the hardcore style
 Frank Goodish, better known as Bruiser Brody – one of the industry's most famous brawlers
 Stan Hansen – member of the WWE Hall of Fame
 Virgil Runnels, better known as Dusty Rhodes – member of the WWE Hall of Fame (also played baseball for the then-West Texas State)
 Merced Solis, better known as Tito Santana – member of the WWE Hall of Fame

References

External links